Club Deportivo Universidad Católica is a professional football club based in Santiago, Chile, Chile, which plays in Chilean Primera División. This chronological list comprises all those who have held the position of manager of the first team of Universidad Católica from 1937. As of the start of the 2021 season, Real Madrid have had 57 full-time managers.

The most successful Universidad Católica manager in terms of trophies won is Ignacio Prieto, who won twos Chilean Primera División titles, a Copa Chile and one Copa República.

List of managers
The complete list of Universidad Católica managers is shown in the following table:
Information correct as of the match played on 4 December 2021. Only competitive matches are counted.

Trophies

References

 
UC
Managers